The Brownlee Tramway of Marlborough, New Zealand, (as opposed to the later Bell Hill mill tramway in Westland) was a bush tramway of the Rai and Pelorus Valleys used to take timber from the Carluke Sawmill through to the shipping port and mill of Blackball, Havelock. It operated from c.1881 through to 1915 as part of William Brownlee's (and later his son, John's) extensive sawmilling operation in the area.

Line

The tramway was built to  gauge, and to a comparatively high standard for the possibility of a government takeover to form a line to Nelson. It totaled  in 1906 and was the only significant tramway in the Marlborough Region. Carluke, a sawmill and settlement near Rai Valley township (named after the Scottish town in which the Brownlee family hailed from) was where the main line began. It headed south through the Rai Valley, and joined the Pelorus River valley on the north side, opposite to the Pelorus River Reserve and Pelorus Bridge. It turned eastwards and followed the Pelorus River until crossing it at 'Dalton's Bridge'. The formation from here now mostly forms part of  until where it crossed the Wakamarina River at Canvastown. An embankment on the east side is still visible today. From here it carried on closely to the main road with some parts having been used by the road since closure until terminating at Blackball. Very little remains at Blackball today except the hull of the abandoned SS Pelorus.

Locomotives

Several self-built internal combustion engine powered trolley was used on the tramway. There were other small locomotives trialed on the tramway as well (see below).

Other Tramways
Brownlee's operated an earlier tramway in the Kaituna Valley south of Havelock in the 1870s. it was not connected to the later Carluke-Blackball tramway. A small vertical boilered loco once worked the line, but did not prove successful.

When the native forest milling rights ran out around the Rai Valley, Brownlee's moved to the West Coast, based in Ruru. William Brownlee was one of the main shareholders of the Lake Brunner Sawmilling Company, and later bought the remaining shares out.

References

External links

Brownlee's Photograph Collection, 252 images
Sailing ships berthed at Havelock 1910 (Blackball)
Logs being hauled by railway from Brownlee's Mill in Carluke
Brownlee's Sawmill at Carluke

Logging railways in New Zealand
3 ft 6 in gauge railways in New Zealand